Eucharideae is a tribe of plants within the family Amaryllidaceae. It was augmented in 2000 by Meerow et al. following a molecular phylogenetic study that revealed that many elements of the tribe Stenomesseae segregated with it, rather than separately, and were subsequently submerged in it (although there was an initial proposal to rename this clade Stenomesseae). It forms one of the tribes of the Andean subclade of the American clade of the subfamily.

Taxonomy 
In Traub's monograph on the Amaryllidaceae (1963), he conceived of a tribe Euchareae based on the type genus, Eucharis and constituted from six genera in total. However, the Müller-Doblies' deemed this to be polyphyletic, and redistributed the genera over three separate tribes, retaining Eucharideae as one of those tribes, but divided into two subtribes,  Eucharidinae and Hymenocallidinae with a total of seven genera. Meerow and Snijman (1998) considered these separate tribes, retaining only four genera in their Eucharideae. The tribe was then considerably reconstituted following a deconstruction of tribe Stenomesseae based on molecular phylogenetics, resulting in seven genera.

Phylogeny 
The placement of Eucharideae within subfamily Amaryllidoideae is shown in the following cladogram:

Genera 
 Eucharis type
 Caliphruria
 Eucrosia
 Phaedranassa
 Rauhia
 Stenomesson
 Urceolina

References

Bibliography

 , in 
 
(additional excerpts)
 
 
 
 
 
 
 
 
 

Amaryllidoideae
Asparagales tribes